Elworthy may refer to:

Places
Elworthy, village in Somerset, England
Elworthy Barrows, Iron Age hill fort about 2 km from Elworthy village

People
Charles Elworthy, Baron Elworthy (1911–1993), Royal Air Force senior officer, Chief of the UK Defence Staff
Charles Elworthy (scientist) (born 1961), New Zealand economist and social scientist
David Elworthy, British mathematician
Edward Elworthy (1836–1899), New Zealand farmer and businessman
Frederick Thomas Elworthy (1830–1907), English philologist and antiquary
Jonathan Elworthy (1936–2005), New Zealand politician
Sir Peter Elworthy (1935–2004), New Zealand farmer and businessman
Robert Pearce Elworthy (1845 – 1925), British entrepreneur
Scilla Elworthy (born 1943), Scottish founder of the Oxford Research Group for  dialogue on nuclear weapons policy and of Peace Direct supporting peace-builders in conflict areas
Steve Elworthy (born 1965), South African former international cricketer, now a cricket administrator